These Days (The Virginia Sessions) is an album released by the Richmond, Virginia, based Pat McGee Band.  It was produced by former keyboardist Todd Wright and was officially released at their July 6, 2007, concert at the Wolf Trap National Park for the Performing Arts, though it had been available on compact disc and via digital download beginning July 1.

The record and the lyrics to "End of October" were dedicated to Chris Williams, who died October 29, 2006.

Track listing
"Guess We Were" 3:45
"I Don't Think I'm Listening" 3:32
"Elizabeth" 3:48
"Come Back Home" 4:09
"All Over You" 4:07
"Maybe It's Time" 5:20
"The Hand That Holds You" 4:43
"You Want It All" 3:06
"The End of October" 3:51

Personnel
Pat McGee: guitars, lead vocals
Brian Fechino: guitars, backing vocals
Crix Reardon: bass, backing vocals
Jonathan Williams: keyboards, backing vocals
Chardy McEwan: percussion, backing vocals
Chris Williams: drum loops
Chris Bashista: drums
Michael Ghegan: tenor saxophone
Todd Wright: "lots of things cool"
Nate Brown: drums
Al Walsh: backing vocals
Hugh McGee: backing vocals
Mike Meadows: cello

Reception

William Ruhlmann of AllMusic said Pat McGee's performance on These Days created a deeper album than previous Pat McGee Band albums.

References

2007 albums
Pat McGee Band albums